Skin Decision: Before and After is a 2020 reality television show streaming television series that will go through the process of cosmetic plastic surgery with two different subjects that would like to change something about themselves in each episode.

Plot 
Some patients suffer from violent attacks or road accidents; others from natural deformities such as acne or the physical damage of alcoholism.

Release 
Skin Decision: Before and After was released on July 15, 2020, on Netflix.

Cast 

 Jamie Sherrill, 8 episodes
 Sheila Nazarian, 8 episodes
 Andrea Garces Lopez, 1 episode
 Katrina M. Goodwin, 1 episode

References

External links
 
 

2020s American reality television series
2020 American television series debuts
English-language Netflix original programming